Patalpani may refer to:

 Patalpani, Bhopal, a village in Bhopal district of Madhya Pradesh, India
 Patalpani railway station, a railway station in Indore district of Madhya Pradesh, India
 Patalpani waterfall in Indore district of Madhya Pradesh, India